"Know Bout Me" is the lead single from American producer and rapper Timbaland's. The song features vocals from Jay Z, Drake and James Fauntleroy.  It was released via digital download on November 21, 2013 in the United States.

Background
On November 15, 2013, Timbaland tweeted a link to "Know Bout Me" online, and it premiered on Power 106, the Los Angeles hip-hop radio station the same day. The song was later added to the iTunes Store on November 21, 2013. A lyric video for the song was released on December 12, 2013.

Charts

Weekly charts

Year-end charts

Release history

References

2013 singles
2013 songs
Timbaland songs
Drake (musician) songs
Jay-Z songs
Mosley Music Group singles
Interscope Records singles
Songs written by Timbaland
Songs written by Drake (musician)
Songs written by Jay-Z
Song recordings produced by Timbaland
Song recordings produced by Jerome "J-Roc" Harmon
Songs written by James Fauntleroy